Rahat Kazmi is a Pakistani actor, screenwriter, TV news presenter anchorman, and an academician. He has worked in several TV serials for PTV such as 1967's Mayaar, 1974's Qurbatain aur Faaslay and 1976's Pakistan's first coloured and classical serial Parchaiyan. Later, he worked in PTV's many other TV dramas such as 1980's Teesra Kinara (that he himself wrote based on Ayn Rand's The Fountainhead), 1980's Ehsaas, and 1985's Dhoop Kinare.

Early life and education
Rahat Kazmi was born in Shimla, on 30 June 1946. Rahat's father was a lawyer by profession, and he wanted his son to follow his footsteps. Rahat completed his high school education in Rawalpindi from Gordon College. He successfully completed and received his law degree (LLB) in Lahore. Additionally, Rahat received his master's degree in political science from Government College University, Lahore and a master's degree in English literature from Punjab University.

Career
He worked for Pakistan Television Network and appeared in famous drama serials such as Qurbatein aur Faslay, Teesra Kinara, Parchayian, Dhoop Kinaray, Raghon mein andhera, Ehsas, Zikar hay kayi saal ka, Nangay Paon, Saraab and others. Currently Rahat is working as an administrative director for L'ecole for Advanced Studies (LAS), an academic institute in Karachi. He also teaches English Literature and Drama to A-level students at LAS, Karachi. Rahat Kazmi is also a director at the National Academy of Performing Arts. He has previously taught at Avicenna School and Hamdard University (Clifton Campus, Karachi) in 2001.

Family
Rahat married Sahira Kazmi in 1974 who herself is an accomplished actress in Pakistan and daughter of actress Mumtaz Qureshi (Taji) and her first husband, actor Shyam. They first met on the sets of PTV in 1971. They have a son Ali Kazmi and a daughter (Nida Kazmi). Nida worked in PTV serials such as Hawaa Ki Beti and Zaibunisa. Later she quit acting, while Ali Kazmi continued his acting career.

Selected filmography

Films

Television

Theater

See also 
 List of Lollywood actors

References

External links
 

Living people
Punjabi people
1946 births
Pakistani male television actors
Pakistani television directors
Pakistani Shia Muslims
Male actors from Karachi
Pakistani television hosts
20th-century Pakistani male actors
Government Gordon College alumni